Dave Tatsuno (born Masaharu Tatsuno August 18, 1913 – January 26, 2006, in California) was a Japanese American businessman who documented life in his family's internment camp during World War II. His footage was later compiled into the film Topaz (named for the Topaz War Relocation Center where he was confined). The film was placed in the National Film Registry, part of the Library of Congress, in 1997.

Tatsuno was a 1936 graduate of the University of California, Berkeley. After graduation, he went to work at Nichi Bei Bussan, a San Francisco department store his father established in 1902. At Topaz, Tatsuno was put in charge of the camp's co-operative store. Upon Tatsuno's release from Topaz in 1945, he reopened his store but moved his family to San Jose in 1948 after his 7-year-old son died during a routine tonsillectomy. Besides being a prominent civic leader, he spent most of his post-war years running Nichi Bei Bussan and had opened a second one in San Jose after relocating his family there. The San Jose store is run by one of his daughters while San Francisco store closed in 1997 after the death of his brother Masateru "Tut".

Tatsuno was predeceased by his wife Alice (died in 2005; née Okada), whom he married in 1938, and a son. He was survived by their five other children, four grandchildren and two great-grandchildren.

See also
Japanese American internment

References

External links
Photograph of the Tatsuno family in the Topaz camp.
Photograph of Dave Tatsuno preparing to evacuate to the Topaz camp.

"American Topics: Rare Look at Internment Camp", The International Herald Tribune, January 27, 1997.

1913 births
2006 deaths
American people of Japanese descent
Businesspeople from San Francisco
Japanese-American internees
University of California, Berkeley alumni
20th-century American businesspeople